Susan Reutzel-Edens  is an American chemist who is the Head of Science at the Cambridge Crystallographic Data Centre. Her work considers solid state chemistry and pharmaceuticals. She is interested in crystal structure predictions. She serves on the editorial boards of CrystEngComm and Crystal Growth & Design.

Early life and education 
Reutzel-Edens was a doctoral researcher at the University of Minnesota, where she studied the design and characterization of hydrogen-bonded imide aggregates. She worked in the laboratory of crystallographer Margaret C. Etter, and made use of solid state NMR. During her doctorate, she investigated how hydrogen bonds could be used as design elements that guided the solid-state self assembly of organic molecules. She made use of the Cambridge Structural Database to unravel the complicated relationships between hydrate formation and crystal polymorphism.

Research and career 
Reutzel-Edens joined Eli Lilly and Company, where she recognized that it would be challenging to identify and design increasingly complicated drug targets, and instead proposed the use of computation approaches. Through collaborations with the Cambridge Crystallographic Database, Reutzel-Edens founded the Lilly solid form design program. Her research has considered crystal polymorphism and the crystal nucleation. She used computational approaches to identify commercially viable small molecule drug products. To this end, Reutzel-Edens proposed the use of crystal structure prediction to identify pharmaceutical molecules to complement experimental investigations. She has described Olanzapine as “an incredible molecule, a gift to crystal chemistry that keeps on giving,”.

In 2018, Reutzel-Edens was appointed Fellow of the Royal Society of Chemistry. She serves on the editorial boards of CrystEngComm and Crystal Growth and Design. In 2021 Reutzel-Edens joined the Cambridge Crystallographic Database as Head of Science.

Selected publications

References 

Living people
University of Minnesota alumni
Eli Lilly and Company people
Year of birth missing (living people)
Solid state chemists